Lee Ki-won (born March 13, 1979), better known by his stage name Kiggen, is a South Korean rapper, singer, lyricist, composer and record producer who is a former member of hip hop group Phantom and the president of the Brand New Music label Korean Roulette.

Discography

Studio albums

Extended plays

Singles

References

External links

1979 births
Living people
South Korean male rappers
South Korean hip hop singers
South Korean people of Japanese descent
Brand New Music artists
21st-century South Korean  male singers
Starship Entertainment artists